St. Xavier’s Institution,  is a private senior school located in Sodepur, (Panihati) West Bengal, India. It is a  co-educational English medium school that educates up to year 12. The school has an open admission policy, accepting students of all castes, creeds and religion.  St. Xavier's was founded by the late Pravash Chandra Banerjee, at Agarpara, on 1 July 1967.

Units and curriculum
St. Xavier's Institution has classes from nursery through secondary school.  The junior, primary, and secondary units use an Indian Certificate of Secondary Education (ICSE) syllabus and the higher secondary units use an Indian School Certificate (ISC) syllabus.
 Pre-Primary
 Todds
 Lower Nursery
 Kindergarten
 Junior School, English Medium, ICSE Syllabus
 Primary I-IV – Junior School, English Medium, ICSE Syllabus
 Secondary V-X – Senior School, English Medium, ICSE Syllabus
 Higher Secondary XI and XII – Senior School, English Medium, ISC Syllabus
There are four houses :- blue, red, green, yellow.
1st. Blue
2nd. Red
3rd. Green
4th. Yellow

References

External links
 Official site

Primary schools in West Bengal
High schools and secondary schools in West Bengal
Schools in Kolkata
Educational institutions established in 1967
1967 establishments in West Bengal